I, Ball is a vertically scrolling shooter published for the Amstrad CPC, Commodore 64 and ZX Spectrum in 1987 by Firebird. It was programmed by Timothy Closs. The C64 version features music written by Rob Hubbard, based on two tunes by Cabaret Voltaire called "Whip Blow" and "I Want You".  Hubbard was commissioned to write music based on the style of the band.
The audio also includes synthesised speech.

It was followed by a sequel, I, Ball 2, released later the same year.

Reception

Reviews were largely positive, with CRASH magazine awarding the Spectrum version of the game 90% and describing it as "a great little game with plenty of lasting appeal". Zzap64 awarded the C64 version 80%, calling it "unusual and competent"

References

External links

1987 video games
Amstrad CPC games
Commodore 64 games
Telecomsoft games
Vertically scrolling shooters
Video games scored by Rob Hubbard
Video games developed in the United Kingdom
ZX Spectrum games